Philippe Vasseur (born 31 August 1943, Le Touquet-Paris-Plage) is a French politician.

Vasseur began his career as a journalist on newspapers and TV. From 1986 to 1999, he was a French Member of Parliament, and, from 1995 to 1997, the French Minister of Agriculture.

References

Living people
Government spokespersons of France
Politicians of the French Fifth Republic
1943 births
French Ministers of Agriculture
People from Le Touquet